André Teixeira may refer to:
André Teixeira (swimmer) (born 1973), Portuguese swimmer
André Teixeira (footballer) (born 1993), Portuguese footballer